Blot-Sweyn (Swedish:Blot-Sven) was a Swedish king c. 1080, who replaced his Christian brother-in-law Inge as King of Sweden, when Inge had refused to administer the blóts (pagan sacrifices) at the Temple at Uppsala. There is no mention of Sweyn in the regnal list of the Westrogothic law, which suggests that his rule did not reach Västergötland. According to Swedish historian Adolf Schück he was probably the same person as Håkan the Red and was called the Blót Swain (a swain who was willing to perform the blót) as an epithet rather than a personal name.

Becoming king
The earliest source that deals with Blot-Sweyn's coming to power is the Icelandic legendary saga Hervarar saga:

However, Inge did not permit the people to follow the old ways, unlike his father Stenkil. The Swedes reacted strongly and asked Inge to either comply with the old traditions or abdicate. When Inge proclaimed that he would not abandon Christianity, the people pelted him with stones and chased him away. This was the opportunity for Sweyn to assume power, and the account provided by Hervarar saga concerning his inauguration contains a rare description of the ancient Indo-European ritual of horse sacrifice:

Legend of Saint Eskil
The later Legend of Saint Eskil tells that Inge was chased away from the kingdom. They then elected an idolator for king by the name Sweyn, an unworthy man and with reason called Blood-Sweyn. He had this name because he made the people drink blood from bulls that had been sacrificed to the gods, and he ate the sacrificial meat. The people assembled around their king in Strängnäs, where they butchered oxen and sheep, and gave offerings to their gods. They had a great banquet in honour of the king and their gods. The English bishop Eskil then appeared and tried to convert the pagans to Christianity. They would not listen, however. Eskil prayed, and God sent thunder, hail, snow and rain destroying the sacrificial altar and beasts of sacrifice. Not a single drop fell on the bishop. The pagans were not impressed and furiously, they attacked Eskil. A diviner named Spåbodde hit him on the head with a stone, while another man crushed his head with an axe. Some chieftains dragged the dying martyr to the king saying that Eskil had used magic arts to control the weather. As soon as the unrightful king had sentenced Eskil to death, he was taken to the valley where the monastery later was founded, and he was stoned to death.

This legend is, however, only known from the late 13th century. An account by Aelnoth of Canterbury (c. 1122) relates that an Eskillinus was killed by pagan Swedes and Geats at an unspecified time. Since he is not mentioned by the clerical historian Adam of Bremen (c. 1075), he may have flourished in the late 11th century. According to another opinion, Eskil's death is more probably dated in c. 1016, several generations before Blot-Sweyn.

How Sweyn was killed
According to Hervarar saga, the rule of Sweyn was not to last. Before long, the Christian Inge decided to kill the pagan Sweyn:

A similar account appears in the Orkneyinga saga, but in this text, Sweyn remains inside and is burnt to death:

Succession
It is possible that Inge was not immediately accepted by the stubbornly pagan Swedes of Uppland. The 13th-century historian Snorri Sturlusson wrote in the Heimskringla that Blót-Sweyn had a pagan successor who continued the sacrifices:

This "Eirik Arsale" (Erik Årsäll) is mentioned in other sources as being the son of Blot-Sweyn, but today is not considered a historical person by most historians.

Notes

11th-century Swedish monarchs
Swedish pagans
Pagan restorations
House of Stenkil
11th-century murdered monarchs
Deaths from fire
Pagan martyrs